Davina Barbara is a Gibraltarian cultural development officer and former broadcast journalist.

Media career
Barbara joined the Gibraltar Broadcasting Corporation in 2001 as a broadcast journalist in the newsroom. She then moved to Radio Gibraltar where she co-produced the station's current affairs programmes.

Gibraltar Cultural Services
In 2018, Barbara was appointed as a cultural development officer for Gibraltar Cultural Services, an agency of the Gibraltar Government. In this role she was acting press officer at the 2018 Gibraltar Literary Festival.

Other activities
Barbara holds a degree in History of Art. She is also known for appearing in local plays and as a singer.

References

External links
 – Video presented by Davina Barbara

Year of birth missing (living people)
Mass media in Gibraltar
Living people